The Peleg Brown Ranch, at 12945 Old Virginia Rd. in Reno, Nevada, dates from 1864. Also known as the Louis Damonte Ranch, it includes Bungalow/craftsman and Greek Revival architecture.

1857 pioneer rancher Peleg Brown, a Rhode Island native arrived in the Truckee Meadows with his brother, Joshua. The two brothers introduced alfalfa to the Truckee Meadows and built their home and ranch 150 years ago which still stands today.

The main house was built in 1864 and has Greek Revival architecture;  it was renovated in 1940 and in 1955.
A play house, built around 1900, is a Craftsman-style  bungalow.

It was deemed significant "for its association with the development of agriculture and irrigation in the Truckee Meadows in the nineteenth and twentieth centuries", including its serving the Comstock Lode mining area.  It served as a stagecoach stop, too.

References

External links

National Register of Historic Places in Reno, Nevada
Greek Revival houses in Nevada
Houses completed in 1864
Ranches on the National Register of Historic Places in Nevada
Stagecoach stops in the United States
Historic American Buildings Survey in Nevada
Houses in Reno, Nevada